Gliquidone (INN, sold under the trade name Glurenorm) is an anti-diabetic medication in the sulfonylurea class. It is classified as a second-generation sulfonylurea. It is used in the treatment of diabetes mellitus type 2. It is marketed by the pharmaceutical company Boehringer Ingelheim (Germany).

Contraindications
 Allergy to sulfonylureas or sulfonamides
 Diabetes mellitus type 1
 Diabetic ketoacidosis
 Patients that underwent removal of the pancreas
 Acute porphyria
 Severe liver disease accompanying with liver insufficiency
 Several conditions (e.g., infectious diseases or major surgical intervention), when insulin administration is required
 Pregnancy or breastfeeding

Pharmacokinetics
Gliquidone is fully metabolized by the liver. Its metabolites are excreted virtually completely with bile (even with long-term administration), thus allowing the use of medication in diabetic patients with kidney disease and diabetic nephropathy.

References

Potassium channel blockers
Imides
Phenol ethers
1-(Benzenesulfonyl)-3-cyclohexylureas
Tetrahydroisoquinolines